L'avvocato delle donne is an Italian legal drama television series.

Cast

Mariangela Melato: Irene Salvi
Filippo Rodriguez: Lorenzo Salvi
Rüdiger Joswig: Sandro Gruber
Mareike Carriere: Giulia Castelli
Carolina Salomè: Alice
Lorenzo Gioielli: Fausto
Paolo Maria Scalondro: P.M. Siena
Leila Durante: Teresa
Claudia Pozzi: Caterina
Romina Mondello: Barbara Bruni
Galatea Ranzi: Laura Nobili
Fabrizia Sacchi: Cinzia
Lorenza Indovina: Rosina Dazzi

External links
 

1997 Italian television series debuts
Italian legal television series
1997 Italian television series endings
RAI original programming